The 2009 Rally Scotland was the 11th and final round of the 2009 Intercontinental Rally Challenge, and the first edition of the Rally Scotland/ The event was held between 19–21 November during some of the wettest weather seen in the UK. The rally was officially started at the historic site of Scone Palace on Thursday 19th and concluded with a ceremonial finish at Stirling Castle on Saturday 21st. The first ten cars were flagged away at the start by the First Minister of Scotland Alex Salmond and Jackie Stewart. 

The weather and the battle between Kris Meeke and Guy Wilks dominated the weekend with Meeke winning the rally on the road. However, due to a technical infringement involving the front subframe of Meeke's car, Meeke was excluded giving the rally win to Wilks. This was the first IRC win for Guy Wilks.

Results

Special stages

References

2009 in Scottish sport
Scotland
Rally Scotland
Rally Scotland

ca:RAC Ral·li d'Escòcia